James Madison Love (March 4, 1820 – July 2, 1891) was a United States district judge of the United States District Court for the District of Iowa and the United States District Court for the Southern District of Iowa.

Education and career

Born on March 4, 1820, in Fairfax County, Virginia, the son of John and Mary Vermillion Love, Love moved with his mother to Zanesville, Ohio the year after his father died. He read law in 1840, first spending a year with his older brother, attorney Thomas R. Love, in Virginia, then in the office of Judge Richard Stillwell in Zanesville. He entered private practice in Coshocton County, Ohio from 1840 to 1846, and from 1848 to 1850. He served in the United States Army during the Mexican–American War from 1846 to 1848, as a captain of the 3rd Ohio Regiment. He continued private practice in Keokuk, Iowa starting in 1850. He was a member of the Iowa Senate from 1853 to 1856.

Federal judicial service

Love received a recess appointment from President Franklin Pierce on October 5, 1855, to a seat on the United States District Court for the District of Iowa vacated by Judge John James Dyer. He was nominated to the same position by President Pierce on February 7, 1856. He was confirmed by the United States Senate on February 25, 1856, and received his commission on December 21, 1856. Love was reassigned by operation of law to the United States District Court for the Southern District of Iowa on July 20, 1882, to a new seat authorized by 22 Stat. 172. His service terminated on July 2, 1891, due to his death in Keokuk. He was the longest serving federal judge to be appointed by President Pierce.

Other service

Concurrent with his federal judicial service, Love was a Professor of commercial law for the State University of Iowa (now the University of Iowa starting in 1875. He was Chancellor of the University of Iowa College of Law.

References

Sources
 

1820 births
1891 deaths
Iowa state senators
Judges of the United States District Court for the District of Iowa
Judges of the United States District Court for the Southern District of Iowa
United States federal judges appointed by Franklin Pierce
19th-century American judges
University of Iowa College of Law faculty
People from Fairfax County, Virginia
People from Coshocton County, Ohio
Ohio lawyers
United States Army officers
American military personnel of the Mexican–American War
People from Keokuk, Iowa
19th-century American politicians
United States federal judges admitted to the practice of law by reading law